Caenopedina otagoensis is a species of sea urchins of the Family Pedinidae. Their armour is covered with spines. Caenopedina otagoensis was first scientifically described in 1968 by McKnight.

References

Animals described in 1968
Pedinoida